John McInnis may refer to:
 John McInnis (Alberta politician) (1950–2003), politician in Alberta, Canada
 John McInnis (British Columbia politician) (ca 1882–1972), politician in British Columbia, Canada
John McInnis Jr. Secondary School

See also
John McInnes (disambiguation)